Lago Sul is an administrative region in the Federal District in Brazil. It is located on the south side of the eastern shore of Lake Paranoá, opposite Brasília. Presidente Juscelino Kubitschek International Airport is located in the southwesternmost edge of this region. A population of 29,537 people reside in this area.

See also
List of administrative regions of the Federal District

References

External links

 Regional Administration of Lago Sul website
 Government of the Federal District website

Administrative regions of Federal District (Brazil)